Poropuntius rhomboides is a species of cyprinid fish endemic to China.

Footnotes 

Cyprinid fish of Asia
Freshwater fish of China
Taxa named by Wu Hsien-Wen
Taxa named by Lin Ren-Duan
Fish described in 1977